The Massacre of Samothrace was the mass murder and enslavement of the Greek population of the island of Samothrace. Following the outbreak of the Greek War of Independence, the Samothracians rose in revolt against the local Ottoman authorities. On 1 September 1821, an Ottoman punitive expedition under Castellan of Dardanelles Mehmet Paşa arrived at the island. After suppressing the uprising of the Samothracian rebels, the Ottoman troops killed or enslaved Greeks from the Island. The remaining Greeks after accepting the amnesty terms of the Ottoman Empire were granted pardon in April 1822, 7 months after the revolt.

Background
Towards the end of the 18th century Samothrace began to flourish economically. Its limited resources, remote location and the absence of a safe harbor that could be used year round led the Ottomans to largely leave the local Greek population to their own devices. The subsequent increase in agricultural production, led to a growth of the island's population and raised the overall quality of life. At the time of the outbreak of the Greek War of Independence, Samothrace, according to Sofi Papageorgiou the population of the Island numbered from approximately 4,000 to over 10,000 inhabitants.

A number of Samothracian prokritoi had joined the Filiki Eteria prior to the outbreak of the rebellion had made preparations for the island to join the upcoming revolt. In April 1821, news of the rising in Peloponnese reached Samothrace. The prokritoi then convinced the Samothracians to declare independence and refuse to pay taxes to the Ottomans. At the same time, a Samiot who lived on the island began training local youths in marksmanship. The rebels overthrew the Ottoman authorities and arrested all the Ottomans residing on the island. However, the island’s isolation from the Greek mainland and the absence of a local ammunition production capability had created unfavorable conditions for a potential insurgency. On the other hand, its proximity to the Ottoman naval facilities in the Hellespont meant that the Ottomans were capable of rapidly deploying large bodies of troops to the island. The Ottoman government did not immediately respond to the revolt on Samothrace as it was more concerned with the larger scale risings in mainland Greece, nevertheless it was later decided that the Samothracians merited exemplary punishment.

Massacre
In August 1821, an Ottoman fleet set sail from the Hellespont towards Samothrace. On 1 September, 1,000 to 2,000 Ottoman troops landed at Makrylies and then proceeded towards Chora, the island's largest town. The vastly outnumbered rebels took positions on the Koukou and Vrychou heights, firing upon the Ottomans once the latter reached Myloi. Offering stiff resistance for many hours, until they ran out of ammunition and retreated towards the island's mountainous interior. Ottoman losses amounted to 23 soldiers killed, including their standard-bearer and 32 wounded. Upon conquering Chora, the Ottomans descended into other populated areas and began to systematically massacre almost everyone they encountered, while enslaving others (mainly children) who were destined to be sold at Constantinople's and Izmir's slave markets. The Ottomans looted the villages and took away the cattle before setting them aflame. Twelve people were hanged from the masts of the Ottoman ships in order to instill fear in the survivors. 

Those who managed to escape sought refuge in the mountains. The Ottomans employed a turncoat named Kyriakos who convinced many of the survivors that they would be amnestied. The Ottomans enslaved the women and children and brought approximately 700 men underneath a Byzantine fortress at Efka where they were massacred. Most of the killed rebels were beheaded, and their heads were subsequently were tossed on the ground in front of the Topkapı Palace Gate.

Aftermath
The American philhellene George Jarvis visited the island on 13 July 1822. According to Jarvis the island's population was reduced to 200 people who lived in absolute poverty. The population began to grow again after several years as many Samothracian women were bought out of slavery and returned to their homeland. They subsequently married Greek men from other areas of Greece who began to settle the island. The massacre at Efka led to the creation of the Samothracian proverb: "I am not one of the 700," which means, "I am not easily fooled." The Ottoman Census of 1831 states that there were 430 Greek and 3 Turkish males of fighting age on the island. This registrar did not register women, orphans, Christians below the age of puberty, the mentally or physically incapacitated as well as high - ranking officials, so the actual population would be much higher. 

Mehmed Paşa, the Castellan of the Dardanelles suppressed the uprising of Samothrace and captured 3 pirate ships from the Samothracians and sent prisoners, heads & ears taken during battle to İstanbul and received a congratulatory Imperial rescript.70-80 Greeks from the island of Samothrace fled to Mounth Athos and have submitted themselves to the gatekeeper of the Mutasarrıf of Thessaloniki Ebulubud Mehmed Emin Paşa. 

Five of the captives brought by the Ottomans to Constantinople converted to Islam, but recanted their beliefs and returned to Christianity after they were bought out of slavery by European philhellenes and returned to Samothrace in 1837. Upon learning about their apostasy, the Ottomans took them to Makri where they were tortured and subsequently executed. The five Samothracians were named Manouel Palogoudas, Michael Kyprios, Theodoros Dimitriou Kalakou, Georgios Kourounis and Georgios became neomartyrs. In 1843, a monk named Iakovos wrote an acolouthia in honor of the Samothrace neomartyrs. It has since been regularly performed on the island, in Makri and in the Mount Athos monasteries on their feast day, Saint Thomas' Sunday (the seventh day after Orthodox Easter). The remains of the saints were initially taken from Makri to Mount Athos but were returned to Samothrace by July 1906. 

The Ottomans tore or burned the books they found during the course of the massacre. A bayoneted bible was recovered by the survivors from the ruins of the Chora village church. It was rediscovered by Ion Dragoumis in Nikolaos Fardys' library during his visit to Samothrace in July 1906. Dragoumis donated the bible to the National Historical Museum, Athens, which houses it in its collection to this day. On 23 March 1980, the Academy of Athens awarded Samothrace its golden medal in recognition of its contribution to the Greek War of Independence.

References

Sources
 
 
 

Massacres during the Greek War of Independence
Massacres in the Ottoman Empire
Persecution of Greeks in the Ottoman Empire before the 20th century
1821 in Greece
History of Samothrace
September 1821 events
Massacres in Europe